"Prove It All Night" is the penultimate song on Bruce Springsteen's fourth studio album Darkness on the Edge of Town, and the first single released from it.

Content
In keeping with a storied tradition of rock songs, these lyrics equate love with the surrendering of a woman's virtue. The protagonist promises to prove his love all night, a vow that can be seen as either opportunistic or youthfully optimistic, depending on one's point of view. Thus it can be experienced as either humorous or sincere. Lyrically the song is similar to other Springsteen numbers such as "Rosalita (Come Out Tonight)" and "Thunder Road". The entire song contains a sense of optimism that the two individuals' quest for love will someday be realized but, at the same time, it seems that the world is closing in on them in that the characters' chances of falling in love are growing more limited as time passes. The song begins with a piano intro played by Roy Bittan. The rhythm guitar work is quite faint, but fits the groove and feel of the song. Following the second stanza is a sax solo which precedes a somewhat intricate-sounding guitar solo by Springsteen. The solo, played quite fast, effectively voices the protagonist's mounting desire to elope.

Cash Box called it a "winner" with "strong upfront beat, chimes, piano/organ and [Clarence] Clemons' rich and rough sax" and "effective hook, raw singing, [and] searching guitar solo." Record World called it "an instantly-memorable Springsteen rocker, dominated by keyboards and sax."

An earlier take of the song has different lyrics; several lines and verses from "Something in the Night" were used instead.

Chart performance
The single gained little traction with Top 40 radio stations, reaching only #33 on the Billboard Hot 100 and #57 in Canada. However, it gained considerable play on progressive rock and album-oriented rock radio formats.

Live performance
"Prove It All Night" has been a regular selection in Springsteen and E Street Band concerts since its release. 

To Springsteen fans, by far the most famous arrangement of it occurred during their 1978 Tour, when it was reshaped into an eleven-minute epic with a long, howling guitar-over-piano introduction and a frenetic organ-and-guitar-over-drums outro. Excerpts of one such performance from a July 1, 1978, Berkeley Community Theatre show were heard during a syndicated radio interview with New York disc jockey Dave Herman on the King Biscuit Flower Hour, and this version would become a fan favorite still referred to decades later; one of the criticisms of Springsteen's 1986 Live/1975-85 box set was that it omitted any such version of the song. Notably, the melody of the extended introduction has been said to have served as the basis for Patti Smith's 1979 song "Frederick", though this has not been verified by Smith. "Prove It All Night" was again performed in this arrangement on two occasions on the River Tour in November 1980. A live version of the song did finally appear on Springsteen's 2001 release Live in New York City documenting the Reunion Tour, as did a Rising Tour performance on the 2003 Live in Barcelona DVD, but both were in a shorter, more conventional treatment.

In a concert in Barcelona during the Wrecking Ball Tour, Springsteen surprised the audience by playing the song again in the 1978 arrangement. He also played it in Manchester to a rapturous response from the crowd. It made its first appearance in the United States since 1980 by request at Fenway Park in Boston on August 15, 2012. It continued to make semi-regular appearances on the remainder of the tour, as well as on 2014's follow-up High Hopes Tour. It was also played by request in São Paulo, Brazil, on September 18, 2013.

Acclaim
The song was ranked as the #6 single of 1978 by Dave Marsh and Kevin Stein and as one of the 7500 most important songs from 1944 through 2000 by Bruce Pollock.

Personnel
According to authors Philippe Margotin and Jean-Michel Guesdon:

Bruce Springsteen – vocals, guitars
Roy Bittan – piano
Clarence Clemons – saxophone
Danny Federici – organ
Garry Tallent – bass
Steven Van Zandt – guitars, vocal harmonies
Max Weinberg – drums

References

External links
Lyrics

1978 singles
Bruce Springsteen songs
Songs written by Bruce Springsteen
Song recordings produced by Jon Landau
Columbia Records singles
1977 songs
Song recordings produced by Bruce Springsteen